Historically, the portrayal of lesbian, gay, bisexual, and transgender (LGBT) people in media have been negative, reflecting the cultural intolerance of LGBT individuals; however, from the 1990s to present day, there has been an increase in the depictions of LGBT people, issues, and concerns within mainstream media in North America. The LGBT communities have taken an increasingly proactive stand in defining their own culture, with a primary goal of achieving an affirmative visibility in mainstream media. The positive portrayal or increased presence of the LGBT communities in media has served to increase acceptance and support for LGBT communities, establish LGBT communities as a norm, and provide information on the topic.

Gwendolyn Audrey Foster stated, "We may still live in a world of white dominance and heterocentrism, but I think we can agree that we are in the midst of postmodern destabilizing forces when it comes to sexuality and race." In her book Imitation and Gender Insubordination (1991), Judith Butler argues that the idea of heteronormativity is reinforced through socio-cultural conditioning, but even more so through visual culture which promotes homo-invisibility.

Overview
Although lesbian, gay, bisexual and transgender individuals are generally indistinguishable from their straight or cisgender counterparts, media depictions of LGBT individuals often represent them as visibly and behaviorally different. For example, in many forms of popular entertainment, gay men are portrayed   stereotypically as promiscuous, flashy, flamboyant,  and bold, while the reverse is often true of how lesbians are portrayed. Media representations of bisexual and transgender people tend to either completely erase them, or depict them as morally corrupt or mentally unstable. Similar to race-, religion-, and class-based caricatures, these stereotypical stock character representations vilify or make light of marginalized and misunderstood groups.

Gay and lesbian families are commonly misrepresented in media because society frequently equates sexual orientation with the ability to reproduce. As well, gay and lesbian characters are rarely the main character in movies; they frequently play the role of stereotyped supporting characters or are portrayed as a victim or villain.

There is currently a widespread view that references to gay people should be omitted from child-related entertainment. When such references do occur they almost invariably generate controversy. In 1997, when American comedian Ellen DeGeneres came out of the closet on her popular sitcom, many sponsors, such as the Wendy's fast-food chain, pulled their advertising.

Media depictions have both benefited and disadvantaged LGBT communities. Milestones to the lesbian and gay communities such as the book Vice Versa and DeGeneres coming out have encouraged other LGBT people to come out and feel better about being themselves.

Despite the stereotypical depictions of gay people, the media has at times promoted acceptance with television shows such as Will and Grace and Queer Eye. The increased publicity reflects the coming-out movement of LGBT communities. As more celebrities come out, more LGBT-friendly shows develop, such as the 2004 show The L Word. With the popularity of gay television shows, music artists and gay fashion, Western culture has had to open its eyes to the gay community.

This new acceptance from the media can partially be explained by the contact hypothesis, aka intergroup contact theory. With more shows promoting the acceptance of gay people, audiences are able to view a more correct depiction of LGBT communities.

In the United States, gay people are frequently used as a symbol of social decadence by celebrity evangelists and by organizations such as Focus on the Family.

LGBT people in the media are often highly misrepresented, usually categorizing all of them into just lesbian and gay identities. Then, people have created stereotypes for lesbian and gay characters. This action contradicts the whole purpose of the fictional characters of LGBT people. It may allow some people to understand that LGBT people are more common than they realize; however, it still reinforces stereotypes and negative stigmas.

History

United States

Early twentieth century
The first representation of same-sex interactions was in 1895 with Edison Short's silent film The Gay Brothers. Through the early twentieth century, portrayals of homosexuality in media was uncommon, however, when represented it was often used as a comic device; for example Sissy Man in Stan Laurel's silent film The Soilers in 1923.

The 1930s brought a new increased presence of LGBT people in media.  In 1934, the strengthening of the Production Code was created in attempt to reduce the negative portrayals of homosexuality in media; however, this made little headway in the movement.  Throughout the 1930s–1960s, an increase in the presence of Christian-based morality was seen, and portrayals (positive or negative) were highly censored or removed.  Many negative sub-contexts remained regarding homosexuality, such as in Alfred Hitchcock's films, whose villains used an implication of homosexuality to heighten their evilness and alienation.

In news media, homosexuality was rarely explicitly mentioned, and it was often portrayed as a sickness, perversion or crime.

Stonewall Riots (1960s)–1980s 
In 1969, a series of spontaneous uprisings in New York called the Stonewall Riots took place as a resistance to the discrimination that LGBT people faced. This marked the beginning of the modern LGBT movement that had taken an increasingly proactive stand in defining LGBT culture, specifically in mainstream media. LGBT activists began confronting repressive laws, police harassment, and discrimination. These demands for equal protection began to be viewed as legitimate news, but the legitimacy of the demands were still viewed as questionable.

LGBT political activists began to pressure Hollywood to end its consistent negative portrayals of homosexuality in media. Responding to the movement, growing visibility in films began to emerge. However, themes of the reality for LGBT people were minimized or totally obscured.

In news, the emergence of more explicit and serious segments of LGBT people began to emerge. In 1967, CBC released a news segment on homosexuality. This segment, however, was a compilation of negative stereotypes of gay men. The 1970s marked an increase in visibility for LGBT communities in media with the 1972 ABC movie That Certain Summer. The movie was about a gay man raising his family, and although it did not show any explicit relations between the men, it contained no negative stereotypes.

Responding to the LGBT efforts for an increased positive presence and to end homophobic portrayals of homosexuality in media led to the National Association of Broadcasters Code Authority agreeing to adopt the NAB Code to guarantee that the LGBT community would be fairly treated in media. Although not a binding agreement, networks began to take precautions and consult LGBT communities before running programs portraying homosexuality. This led to the presence of LGBT characters beginning in prime time television, although in minimal amounts or in episodes that concentrated on homosexuality. Nevertheless, such presentations were greeted as signs of greater social acceptance.

1980s and the emergence of the AIDS epidemic 
With the emergence of the AIDS epidemic and its implicit relation to gay men, media outlets varied on their coverage, portrayal and acceptance of LGBT communities. The Moral Majority, the Coalition for Better Television, and the American Family Association began to organize boycotts against sponsors of television programs that showed homosexuals in what they viewed as a positive light.

Media coverage of LGBT communities varied during the 1980s depending on the location and therefore the nature of the market and management of the organization. For example, in San Francisco, The San Francisco Chronicle hired an openly gay reporter and ran detailed stories on LGBT topics. This is in contrast to The New York Times which refused to use the word "gay" in its writing, preferring to use the term "homosexual", as it was perceived as a more clinical term, and continued to limit its coverage of LGBT issues, in both verbal and visual form.

The AIDS epidemic forced mainstream media to acknowledge the large existence of LGBT communities, and coverage increased. News coverage began to distinguish between "innocent" victims who had not acquired AIDS through homosexual contact and "guilty" victims who had. This coverage portrayed the LGBT community in a negative light and can be seen as a step back in the movement for equality. However, the AIDS epidemic did force the media to regard LGBT people in a more serious light. It also resulted in an increase in education regarding LGBT people and issues; editors and reporters began to learn more about LGBT communities and therefore became more sensitive to the tone in which they reported on their issues.

Furthermore, the increase in contact with the LGBT community lead to a greater emergence of LGBT figures in media as contacts were made during reports of the AIDS epidemic, as well as those speaking out and those who had contracted the virus themselves. This increase in contact led to an awareness of how homophobia was woven into the government's media responses to the AIDS epidemic and this paved the way for future movements.

"Bury your gays" 
Across media, gay or lesbian characters tend to meet unhappy endings such as heartbreak, loss, insanity, depression or imprisonment. In many cases, they end up dying, either through suicide, homophobic attacks, illness or other means. Viewers call this trope "bury your gays" and "dead lesbian syndrome". 

This happens especially often in television shows. According to Autostraddle, which examined 1,779 scripted U.S. television series from 1976 to 2016, 11% (193) of them featured lesbian or bisexual female characters, and among these, 35% saw lesbian or bisexual characters dead, while only 16% provided a happy ending for them. Similarly, among all lesbian or bisexual characters in ended series, 31% ended up dead, and only 10% received a happy ending. In a study of 242 character deaths in the 2015–2016 television season, Vox reported that "A full 10 percent of deaths [were] queer women." In one month of 2016, four lesbian or bisexual women were killed in four shows, further showcasing the prevalence of this occurrence on screen. Such statistics led Variety to conclude in 2016 that "the trope is alive and well on TV, and fictional lesbian and bisexual women in particular have a very small chance of leading long and productive lives". GLAAD's 2016 TV report stated:  

The death of Lexa in the CW's The 100 sparked viewer outrage and widespread controversy, becoming one of the first deaths to draw mainstream attention. Fans took to the internet to voice their frustrations and spearheaded initiatives to help bring about change. The 100 showrunner Jason Rothenberg later admitted to his mistake of perpetuating the trope, stating: "I would've done some things differently." In an attempt to combat this, the writers of the show Saving Hope, in collaboration with LGBTQIA+ activist organization The Trevor Project, established the Lexa Pledge, a plea to showrunners and TV writers to do better by their LGBTQIA+ characters. The pledge details numerous ways that writers can better represent the LGBTQIA+ community by providing queer characters with meaningful storylines and to avoid killing them off in order to forward the plot of a straight character. The pledge was met with support with writers from shows like The Catch and Rookie Blue signing the pledge. However, some showrunners, most notably Grey's Anatomy showrunner Krista Vernoff, acknowledged the importance of the pledge in raising awareness but felt it could limit storytelling abilities and halt progress in terms of onscreen representations of queer characters. When the final season of She-Ra and the Princesses of Power premiered in 2020, showrunner ND Stevenson said that he could not "see another gay character die on TV for the moment. Maybe one day we can have a tragic gay romance again, but that has been, like, the only norm for so long." The pledge and subsequent reaction added nuance to the ongoing conversations surrounding onscreen representations of queer people, changing the way people think about diversity and queer representation.

LGBT characters also go through similar things in other fiction, such as video games, where, according to Kotaku, LGBT characters are "largely defined by a pain that their straight counterparts do not share". Facing challenges that "serve as an in-world analogy for anti-LGBTQ bigotry", these characters are defined by tragedy that denies them a chance at happiness. While games like The Last of Us or Life Is Strange forward LGBTQIA+ representation in the gaming sphere by featuring queer lead characters, they still fall victim to tragedy or death. The Last of Us DLC features lead character Ellie engaging in a brief moment of queerness not long before her love interest dies, and the game's sequel features Ellie as an openly queer woman yet continues to emotionally torture her.

Increasing awareness and criticism of the trope has influenced creators to attempt to avoid it. In 2018, Star Trek: Discovery aired an episode in which a gay character played by Wilson Cruz was killed. Immediately after the episode aired, Cruz, GLAAD, and the showrunners released reassuring statements intimating that the character's death may not be final, with specific reference to avoiding the cliche. In the following season, Cruz's character returned from the dead by science-fictional means, and Cruz was added to the main cast. Elsewhere, Schitt's Creek writer and creator Dan Levy acknowledged that he wanted the relationship between David and Patrick to steer clear of tragedy and heartbreak in an open response to the growing trend of unhappy queer characters across the media landscape. Cast members of the show Yellowjackets were relieved to hear that the show chose to avoid the killing or mistreating of LGBT characters unfairly and were willing to take a stand in order to ensure the appropriate treatment of the onscreen queer characters.

News coverage of LGBT events

Much of the negative media that surrounds LGBT communities have to do with pride parades that turn into drag shows or riots. There is very little positive media coverage. Some examples of positive coverage are marches for same-sex marriage and shows like Ellen and RuPaul's Drag Race, both of which assists in giving the LGBTQ+ community a more positive outlook. Opponents argue that such displays of sexuality and nudity in public is not appropriate, although lately more shows depict lesbian and gay sexuality. News stories have often identified the opposition to these demonstrations as being led by Christian conservatives or strong believers of the Islamic religion, and not political figures. Many of the views against the LGBT communities are symbolic racism: People argue against nudity in public because it violates their traditional values.

Media are designed to be a reflection of society and different communities. Mainstream media channels like CBS are the most watched and a highly underrepresented media outlet for the LGBT community. Media is a business that requires an audience and ratings. To achieve this, people who they feel will be watching are targeted. People of color are becoming leaders, but major media outlets, such as newspapers, magazines, and TV, are refusing to acknowledge their existence. Historically, news coverage has only covered homonormative LGBT people. Homonormative is the replication of a normative heterosexual lifestyle excluding sexuality.

Marketing to the LGBT community
LGBT communities have been targeted by marketers who view LGBT people as an untapped source of discretionary spending, as many couples have two income streams and no children. As a result, companies are advertising more and more to LGBT people, and LGBT activists use advertisement slogans to promote community views. Subaru marketed its "Forester" and "Outback" models with the slogan "It's not a choice. It's the way we're built", which was later used in eight United States cities on streets or in gay rights events. This statement has been used for years by LGBT people before the company decided to use the slogan.

Media representations of non-binary people

There are very few representations of non-binary people or characters in the media.  Most of the non-binary representation happens in communities made by and for people who are non-binary, and contain largely self-made content, often about the content-maker.

One of the first prominent instances of a non-binary person being represented in popular media was the 2014 short film Break Free, created by Ruby Rose. As of November 20, 2014, the video had garnered 1,833,889 views.

A possible reason for there being very little representation of non-binary individuals in the media is a lack of repetition.  According to Judith Butler's conceptualization of gender as performative, and her theory of gender performativity, we can understand that repeated instances of a concept, in this case, non-binary gender in the media, attribute legibility and coherence to that concept.  Since there is a lack of repetition or multiple productions of representation of non-binary gender in the media, that absence will continue until such a time when there are more repeated representations of non-binary gender in the media. There are additional representations of non-binary gendered individuals coming to various media outlets.  While still very few representations of non-binary gendered individuals exist in media, as both transgender and non-binary gendered individuals gain visibility and advance politically, further representation in media sources may quickly follow.

As there has been little attention paid to representing non-binary gendered individuals in the media, there has also been little attention focused on recognizing or addressing that absence.

History of LGBT music 
LGBT music, or music that is either produced or sung by an LGBT individual or music that is sung about the LGBT experience, debuted in the 1920s blues era . In the beginning of queer music, many songs discussed coming out, acceptance, Pride and Stonewall. In the 1970s, it switched to talking about people like Anita Bryant, San Francisco politician Harvey Milk and Dan White. With the rise of the AIDS epidemic, many queer songs in the 1980s and 1990s addressed the emotional (often anger, and grief), political and social aspects of the AIDS crisis.

1920s–1930s
In 1935, Bessie Jackson (Lucille Bogan) released her song "B.D. Woman Blues" (the B.D. standing for Bull Daggers). Frankie "half-Pint" Jackson, another blues artist of this time, was known for singing as a female impersonator and in 1929 released a song titled "My Daddy Rocks Me With One Steady Roll". This period was also a time for "cross-vocals", which are songs intended to be sung by a woman but are sung by men instead, without changing pronouns. This came about in the 1920s and 30s when music producers would not allow singers to change a song's wording. This led to men singing about men and subsequently women singing about women without public scrutiny, because they were aware of the restrictions placed on the singers by the music producers. (An example of "cross-vocals" would be Bing Crosby and his recording of "Ain't No Sweet Man Worth the Salt of My Tears".)
Also in the late 1920s and 1930s was The Pansy Craze. This was when openly gay performers suddenly became popular in major city nightclubs. Two of the most popular performers to emerge from this craze were Jean Malin, who sang "I'd Rather Be Spanish Than Mannish", and Bruz Fletcher in 1937 with "She's My Most Intimate Friend".

1950s–1960s
Between the 30s and the 60s, Ray Bourbon was one of the most well-known female impersonators, in 1956 Ray changed his name to Rae Bourbon and released and album titled "Let Me Tell You About My Operation", in response to Christine Jorgensen's famous sex change, which had been dominating the news. In the early 1960s Camp Records released two albums which featured artists like Sandy Beech, Max Minty & the Gay Blades, and a song by Byrd E Bath called "Homer the Happy Little Homo". In response to this album, Teddy & Darrel released an LP called "These Are the Hits, You Silly Savages" with the hope that they could use the sale records to track down homosexuals; however, they were unable to do so because the sales were so spread out and diverse. In 1963 Jackie Shane released his song "Any Other Way" with the lyrics "tell her that I'm happy, tell her that I'm gay, tell her that I wouldn't have it, any other way" which reached #2 on the Canadian charts and in 1968 Minette was the first female impersonator to release an entire album which dealt with subjects such as the hippie movement, psychedelic drugs and Vietnam.

1970s–1980s
The 1970s was the birth of glam rock and the pop punk gay scene, which included artists like David Bowie. In 1971, Maxine Feldman wrote a song called "Stonewall Nation" after participating in her first gay march in Albany, New York and in 1972 she was the first openly lesbian to be elected as the delegate to a major national political convention. The 1970s also brought a lot of first for the Queer music scene. In 1973, "Lavender Country" was the first openly gay country album (20 years later, "Out in the Country" by Doug Stevens & the Outband was the second). Also in 1973, the first openly gay rock albums was produced by Chris Robison and his Many Hand Band, which included the song "Lookin' for a Boy Tonight", and Alix Dobkin formed her own record label called Women's Wax Words. She then went on to produce the album "Lavender Jane Loves Women", which was the first album to be produced, financed, performed, and engineered entirely by lesbians.

In 1974, Steven Grossman became the first artist to have a lyrically gay album, titled "Caravan Tonight" released by the major record label called Mercury. This album featured the song "Out" and was the first album with openly gay lyrics to be produced by a major record label. Finally, in 1977, Olivia Records released the first various artist album that featured solely lesbian performers. The album, Lesbian Concentrate, was produced in reaction to the bigotry of Anita Bryant and her anti-LGBT rights crusade.

In 1981, Rough Trade, a band led by Carole Pope, reached the Top 20 in Canada with their song "High School Confidential"; this is one of the first openly lesbian songs to reach the charts. That same year, Canadian artist David Sereda released his song "Underage Blues", which discusses what it is like to be a gay teenager. In 1983, La Cage aux Folles became the first musical with an openly gay central plot to be a big hit and featured the song "I Am What I Am".

In 1984, one of the earliest songs addressing AIDS was released by Automatic Pilot, a San Francisco-based group. The song was called "Safe Living in Dangerous Time". Although the song was recorded in 1984, the album was not released until 2005 because multiple group members died due to the AIDS epidemic. Also from LA came the rapping group Age of Consent, which was one of the first groups to ever have lyrically gay raps. One of their songs, called "History Rap", tells the story of the Stonewall Riots. In 1985, a rare performance by Christine Jorgensen, an entertainer who was known for having a sex change in the 1950s, was recorded.

1990s–present
From the 1990s onwards, there appeared many queer singers, songwriters and musicians that belong to many genres. One example of a well-known queer artist is Meshell Ndegeocello, who entered the hip-hop scene in the 1990s. During this time Bill Clinton was elected president, and the gay and lesbian movement was still in full force from collective organization against AIDS in the 80s. Her song "Leviticus: Faggot" talks about the sexist and misogynist violence experienced by young, black, gay men due to their identities. Some other more recent artists include Against Me! with their album Transgender Dysphoria Blues, ONSIND, Fridge Scum and Spoonboy.

Asexuality in television

Asexuality receives sparse attention in the media. It is often viewed as a "lack" of something, which is difficult to actively portray on screen. Additionally, asexuality has yet to be fully recognized as a legitimate sexual orientation. Therefore, when it does get representation in the media, asexual characters are often not the main characters or the focus of story lines, and/or tend to be framed around a mindset of needing to be fixed or changed.

An example of this type of portrayal occurs in an episode of the popular TV show House, M.D. In the Season 8 episode "Better Half", a couple declare themselves happily asexual. However, the main character House's immediate reaction to their statement is "there must be some medical cause". He then sets out to prove that there is no way they can be asexual by choice. House eventually discovers a brain tumor in the husband that has been suppressing his sexuality. When this is revealed, his wife then admits that she said she was asexual purely to be with her husband, and that before they met she had enjoyed sexual encounters.

The show Sirens (US version) portrays asexuality through one of the main female characters, nicknamed Voodoo, and her asexuality is recognized and talked about throughout the series.

The Netflix animated television series Bojack Horseman has received acclaim from the community for its portrayal and discussion of asexual topics through the character of Todd Chavez, a main character, who comes out as asexual in the season 3 finale. In the fourth season, he discovers a group of people who also identify as asexual who help him learn more about his asexuality.

Calls for stronger asexual representation began upon the release of The CW's Riverdale, when the show's writers made the decision to exclude the asexuality of the character Jughead, canonically asexual in the Archie comics upon which the show is based, despite encouragements from actor Cole Sprouse to retain the character's sexual identification. The show went on to feature a homosexual character and a bisexual character, furthering evidence that Jughead's asexuality was intentionally unacknowledged by the writers as an LGBT identity.

On December 18, 2020, when asked if the colors of the librarian named Kaisa in Hilda were made to intentionally match the asexual flag, series creator Luke Pearson said that while he did not purposely make her colors match those of the aromantic flag in his rough design for the character, it was "not impossible" that her design, her hair and colors, matched the colors of the asexual flag because he did not draw the final design of the character in the show. The character has purple hair, a black cape, a gray shirt with white sleeves, all of which are colors on the asexual flag.

Media portrayal of LGBT people of color

Overwhelmingly, the portrayal of LGBT people in the American media centers on white LGBT people and their experiences. LGBT persons of color are severely underrepresented in the media in comparison to their actual population within the community.

Most LGBT characters who appear in mainstream media are white. LGBT people of color are often misrepresented and underrepresented in the media. Media representations of LGBT characters are disproportionately white. In GLAAD's annual "Where We Are on TV" report, it was found that out of the 813 broadcast network's series regular characters, only 13% are black, 8% Latino/Latina, 4% Asian, and 2% multi-racial. Out of the 74 LGBT-identified characters on mainstream broadcast networks, only 11% are black, 11% Latina/Latino, and 5% Asian. People of color therefore make up 27% of characters and 34% of LGBT characters. What people see on television are white stories and experiences. "Media is indeed a powerful way to construct, modify, and spread cultural beliefs. Television drama is a form of media, which gets into our households, almost without us realizing it and informs us, the viewers, of a series of representations and values that are ingrained in Western society and, at the same time, are either reinforced or undermined within that cultural representation, in this case, television drama."

"Popular television shows including Will & Grace, Sex and the City, Brothers and Sisters, and Modern Family routinely depict gay men. Yet the common characteristic among most televisual representations of gay men is that they are usually white." Having both a queer and black or non-white character is creating multi-faceted "otherness", which is not normally represented on television. Additionally, while many shows depict LGBT people of color, they are often used as a plot device or in some type of cliche. Santana Lopez, for example, from the teenage dramedy Glee, is a queer woman of color; however, she is often characterized as a Latina fetish and over-sexualized. In Season 6 of Glee, Santana Lopez marries Brittany Pierce, a white bisexual. Along with these two characters, Blaine Anderson and Kurt Hummel are two important LGBT characters in Glee. Darren Criss, who portrays Blaine, is half-Asian, while Chris Colfer, who portrays Kurt, is white. In conjunction, Callie Torres, who was one of the first bisexual Latina characters on mainstream television, was first depicted as a "slut", and this Latina stereotype was used as much of her single plot-device.

Moreover, non-white LGBT characters are often depicted as "race neutral". For example, on the ABC Family show, GRΣΣK, Calvin Owens is openly gay and many of his storylines, struggles, and plots revolve around his self-identification as LGBT. However, while being physically African-American, it is never mentioned in the show, and he is never seen as "explicitly black".

As queer politics continue to become a defining part of the decade, television continues to reflect that. Starting with hits like Modern Family, gay homonormativity is becoming a mainstay on broadcast television. There has been a cultural shift from white, gay men being depicted as non-monogamous sex-seekers, stemming from the AIDS epidemic to being "just like everyone else" in their quest to be fathers. This Hollywood trend, while expanding LGBT representations on TV, is really only giving a single-story of LGBT communities and completely neglecting other LGBT stories.

A recent exception to the lack of LGBT people of color on television represented in a realistic, non-fetish or race-neutral way, is the ABC Family show, The Fosters. The Fosters depicts a blended family of one biological child, two adopted children, and two foster children being raised by a lesbian, multi-racial couple. Two of the children are Latino and have struggles and storylines relating to that. The couple, around whom the show is based, also struggles with race as source of conflict on top of their LGBT storyline. Another example of a show with LGBT people of color includes Netflix’s show One Day at a Time that includes a Latina lesbian character who has many storylines that do not revolve around her LGBT identity.

In January 2015, GLAAD announced nominations for the 26th annual Media Awards. Many of these nominees included LGBT people of color. There have also been several series and shows that have started to represent this topic in a more "fair, accurate and inclusive" way. There is also support from well-known actors such as Channing Tatum, who will be presenting the award to the winner of the 26th annual Media Awards.

On December 30, 2020, Donnie Lopez published an article on Black Girl Nerds, lamenting the lack of an "animated gay Latino male superhero being the lead of his own show," saying that while there has been an increase in the number of "LGBT+ folks being presented on family animated superhero shows," this has mainly focused on lesbian and bisexual characters, without "gay male Latino/Hispanic superhero animated leads." Lopez added that maintaining, popularizing, and creating gay characters can start to assuage harmful attitudes, noting that shows seldom "give gay male POC characters the title roles" in children's animation, leading them to perpetrate the idea that "gay male characters cannot be standalone titular characters." Even so, he gives the example of Aqualad in Season Three of Young Justice who is a bisexual Black man, while qualifying this by saying that Aqualad is "not the principal character of the show" and noting that while Super Drags did make gay men the protagonists, it "reinforced negative stereotypes" and hoped that the "lack of gay representation" in these animations could be remedies in the future.

Breakdown of LGBT representation
Over the past five years, there has been an increase in the number of regular and recurring LGBT characters in mainstream American media. Each population has experienced general growth in representation, some more than others. Gay characters are the most frequently depicted of the LGBT communities by a wide margin, followed by lesbian, bisexual, and transgender characters. However, heading into the new season, this trend will change in cable television with the number of bisexual identifying characters surpassing the number of lesbian characters for the first time. Additionally, the transgender community is the only one of the four to lose representation in media, declining from 2013 to 2014 on cable networks while losing representation entirely on broadcast networks. In terms of gender identity, a majority of the LGBT characters in media are male, though female characters follow within a close margin. Only one percent of characters identified as FtM (female-to-male transgender).

Television
Every year GLAAD releases a report, entitled Where We Are on TV, with percentages of expected regular and recurring LGBT characters on broadcast and cable, and the previous few years streaming and television.  Throughout the past six years, the highest percentage or representation of LGBT characters in mainstream television, both broadcast and cable, was gay men.

Some of the notable LGBT characters from television and steaming services are Will Truman and Jack McFarland on Will & Grace, Lexa and Clarke on The 100, Poussey Washington, Suzanne 'Crazy Eyes' Warren, Nicky Nichols and Alex Vause on Orange is the New Black, Willow Rosenberg and Tara Maclay on Buffy the Vampire Slayer, Callie Torres and Arizona Robbins on Grey's Anatomy, and Alex Danvers on Supergirl.

Other shows with LGBT characters include Modern Family, Pretty Little Liars, Orphan Black, Wynonna Earp, Nomi Marks, Amanita Caplan, Lito Rodriguez, and Hernando on Sense8, Shadowhunters, The Bold Type, One Day at a Time, The Real O'Neals, The Fosters, Degrassi: The Next Generation, Stranger Things, Cobra Kai, Ellen, Glee, The L Word, Lost Girl, Queer as Folk, and Heartstopper (TV series).

A more complete list of characters can be found on the pages List of dramatic television series with LGBT characters: 1960s–2000s, 2010–2015, 2016–2019, 2020s, and List of comedy television series with LGBT characters.

Starting in the 2015–2016 season, GLAAD started including original content created on the streaming sites Amazon, Hulu, and Netflix in the Where We Are On TV Annual Report.

In Will & Grace, Will Truman is presented as "straight passing" gay man who fits in with heteronormative society. Will's friend Jack, on the other hand, was used as comic relief and was presented as flamboyant and non-threatening. He was represented the other stereotypical gay character and the opposite of Will. Because of Will & Grace, there are now more gay characters on television. Will & Grace also showed a wider audience that television shows with gay characters do not have to be all about the gay community, but can deal with more mainstream problems such as romance and fights with friends. Now, more television shows have gay characters without focusing on their sexuality, but rather making it another facet of the character such as their hair eye color or age.

Film
Starting in 2013, GLAAD started releasing a Studio Responsibility Index at the beginning of each year which reported on the quality, quantity, and diversity of LGBT characters in films released by 20th Century Fox, Paramount Pictures, Sony Columbia, Universal Pictures, the Walt Disney Studios, and Warner Brothers the previous year.

In 2012, 14 of 101 films had lesbian, gay, or bisexual characters and no films had transgender characters.  Of the 14 films, 4 contained LGBT characters as major characters.

In 2013, 17 of 102 films had identifiable LGBT characters. That year, Lionsgate Entertainment was also included in the statistics. Most of the LGBT characters were found in comedies.

In 2014, 20 films out of the 114 tracked releases had LGBT characters.  The depictions were mostly minor roles and regarded as stereotypes.  Focus Features, Fox Searchlight, Roadside Attractions, and Sony Pictures Classics were also tracked this year for LGBT representation.  There were 28 LGBT characters in mainstream films.  There were no identifiable transgender characters.

In 2015, 22 the 126 releases had identifiable LGBT characters.  There was one film with a transgender character. There were 47 LGBT characters, an increase from the previous year.

A few of the most notable LGBT films are Brokeback Mountain, Carol, Boys Don't Cry, Blue is the Warmest Color, Paris is Burning, Hedwig and the Angry Inch, The Kids are All Right, Milk, Victor/Victoria, Rent, and The Rocky Horror Picture Show.

New Queer Cinema 
The term New Queer Cinema (NQC) was first coined by the academic B. Ruby Rich in Sight & Sound magazine in 1992 to define and describe a movement in queer-themed independent filmmaking in the early 1990s.  In New Queer Cinema, author Michele Aaron states that films created during this time must meet the following requirements in order to be considered NQC:The film must give voice to marginalized or underrepresented LGBT stories, defy cinematic conventions, resist positive imagery, disregard historical stereotypes, and defy death often in terms of AIDS.Aaron states that much of the progress seen within the Hollywood film industry is due to the work of filmmakers and crews of NQC. Consequently, shifts in marketing have been implemented to target LGBT audiences.

WebTV 
The rise in web-based television, streaming, and other entertainment networks grant both affordances and limitations on LGBT representation in media. In Open TV: Innovation Beyond Hollywood and the Rise of Web Television, Christian suggests that the freedom of online networks presents new forms of cultural representation outside the traditional media system. Independent creators, entrepreneurs, and audiences are shaping the media networks in which they engage with. The alternate possibilities of online networks such as Open TV contribute to the increase in diverse storytelling and representations of marginalized communities.

In The Value of Representation: Toward a Critique of Networked Television Performance, professor and author Aymar J. Christian explores the foundations on which he established the platform Open TV in 2015 based in Chicago. Christian notes that by altering production, exhibition, and legacy (linear, one-to-many) media infrastructures, networked Internet distribution can challenge LGBT representations. Open TV provides an intersectional framework in which media representations of LGBT people can be challenged, assessed, and created. Christian argues that local and small-scale media development redefines the political and social values of representation in TV and art. Furthermore, Christian highlights that such representation methods illuminate the historically overlooked value of local communities and performances of culture.

Production and development inequalities are embedded within legacy media networks, yet corporate structures often profit from cultural representation. Christian questions the value placed on cultural representation and how it is intertwined in the economics of media creation and distribution.

As an advance to media representation theory, Open TV provides LGBT individuals, ciswomen, and artists of color the opportunity to create, distribute, and exhibit independent pilots, original series, or syndicated series. Open TV centers the production and exhibition of artworks around artists and their communities.

LGBT representation in children's media 

There have been increased occurrences of LGBT characters and themes in children's shows across channels such as Nickelodeon, and Disney Channel. Inclusion of these themes prompted the Parent's Television Council to release a report ranking Nick at Night and Disney Channel near-perfect in terms of child-appropriateness and rating accountabiliy. Although not exclusively for children, "Animation has a long history of flirting with queerness... mostly through sissy characters and otherwise effeminate men... Depictions of female queerness are far rarer and more benign." Since 2010, cartoons have related to these general trends, particularly The Legend of Korra, SheZow, Adventure Time, and Steven Universe.

In 2008–2015, The Girl Bunnies by Françoise Doherty became the first children's animated series to have all of its lead characters LGBT. These leads include lesbian and transgender children. The 4 short musical animated films have screened in 21 countries and have garnered awards in Montreal, Canada, and in Paris, France.

The first example is Nickelodeon's original show, The Legend of Korra, the last five episodes of which were only available online. Reaching towards adult audiences, it tells "some of the darkest, most mature stories ever committed to screen by an animated program". The show ends with main characters Korra and Asami deciding to go "on vacation" to the spirit world together, "while romantic music plays". They walk away holding hands, then stand facing each other in a "climactic spirit portal moment" that did much more than "denote mere friendship". This "groundbreaking... earth-bending" shot "changed the face of TV". Writer of the series, Mike Dimartino, confirmed that Korra and Asami did in fact have romantic feelings for each other. "The message sent is that queer people are no less wholesome, no less natural, no more implicitly or explicitly sexual, and no more dangerous for kids to see than straight people." Fans of the show have even inserted a kiss animation to the final seconds.

SheZow, much like superhero precursor Captain Marvel (or Shazam!) is a crime-fighter with a magic ring. However, it is a woman's ring, so it turns Guy, a 12-year-old boy (not his twin sister Kelly, president of the SheZow fanclub) into a female superhero. A Christian group, One Million Moms, protested, "The media is determined to pollute the minds of our children... desensitizing them through a cartoon program... [whose] superhero represents both genders by cross-dressing and being transgendered." However, show creator Obie Scott Wade called it a show about "responsibility" and "not so much about gender", stating "Guy does learn many things about himself by becoming SheZow... as an ordinary slacker who is suddenly forced to save the world, but with a unique story element that adds a lot of comedy." Guy does not "identify as transexual [sic]", and whether or not children perceive him as such, "from an adult perspective... secret identities were and still are, a huge part of what it meant to be a lesbian, gay, bi or transgender person."

Another show with very strong LGBT themes is Cartoon Network's Steven Universe created by Rebecca Sugar. Steven Universe has been called "one of the most unabashedly queer shows on TV" by The Guardian.  According to Erik Adams "gender is at the forefront of... Steven Universe" but there are plenty of other queer themes within the series as well.  In the episode "Alone Together" the main character Steven and his friend Connie fuse to become Stevonnie.  When asked about the gender of the character Stevonnie, Sugar replied that "Stevonnie is an experience, the living relationship between Steven and Connie."  She also says that "Stevonnie challenges gender norms as an individual, but also serves as a metaphor for all the terrifying firsts in a first relationship."  In a public service announcement about self-esteem and self-image on social media posted to Cartoon Network's Twitter and Instagram accounts, Stevonnie's status as intersex and non-binary was confirmed.  On July 6, 2018, the show depicted the first same-sex wedding on a Cartoon Network series, between the female characters Ruby and Sapphire.  There are many more queer themes that arc across many episodes of this show, as well as its sequel series Steven Universe Future, such as a depiction of a non-binary character named Shep as the new partner of a recurring character, as well as the unrequited love Pearl had for Rose, and the relationship between Bismuth and Pearl.

Cartoon Network's popular children's television show Adventure Time, created by Pendleton Ward, also has queer themes.  One way that this show represents the LGBT community is through its deconstruction of heteronormativity. Australian media commentator Emma Jane says that Adventure Time is "a program which subverts many traditional gender-related paradigms."  Jane also discusses the idea of gender fluidity within the show by pointing out characters that lack a fixed gender (i.e., BMO or Gunther) as well as characters possessing many traits that are traditionally gendered (i.e., eyelashes and hair) but those traits not having any bearing on their actual gender.  The final episode of the show showed a kiss between the two female characters of Princess Bubblegum and Marceline the Vampire Queen.

Adventure Time is not alone in revealing a queer relationship in its finale. The final episode of the animated Disney Channel show Gravity Falls revealed two male cops, Sheriff Blubs and Deputy Durland, as a romantic pair. The finale of the 2018 Netflix original series She-Ra and the Princesses of Power featured a romantic confession and kiss between the two female leads, Adora/She-Ra and Catra. The show also featured a recurring lesbian relationship between supporting characters Spinnerella and Netossa, a gay couple as the dads of supporting character Bow, and a non-binary character named Double Trouble as an antagonist.

The Netflix original The Dragon Prince also displays LGBT themes. In Season Two, the show received criticism over the deaths of two lesbian characters, Queens Annika and Neha, die, leaving behind a child. The following season, the show revealed the male character Runaan to be in a relationship with another male character, Ethari.

Disney's first ever gay kiss appeared in their animated series Star vs. the Forces of Evil. The series also showed supporting character Jackie Lynn Thomas in a lesbian relationship

The movie Love, Simon is notable as the first film by a major Hollywood studio to focus on a gay teenage romance.

In 2017, Disney Channel's Andi Mack made history with the depiction of the character Cyrus Goodman (portrayed by Joshua Rush), making him Disney Channel's first-ever character to come out as gay. On February 9, 2019, Andi Mack yet again made television history when Cyrus came out to his male best friend, Jonah Beck (Asher Angel), saying "I'm gay", making him the first Disney character to ever use the word "gay" in its modern meaning. Cyrus developed mutual feelings for the captain of the basketball team, TJ Kippen (portrayed by Luke Mullen), and in the series finale, these feelings were made apparent and the two held hands, marking the start of the first romance between two male characters and the first gay romance involving a main character in Disney history.

In July 2020, CBBC aired an episode of The Next Step featuring two teenage girls kissing. Prior to the scene, characters Cleo (Dani Verayo) and Jude (Molly Saunders) were written to confess their feelings for each other, and begin a relationship together. The scene made history as the first same-sex kiss to be aired on the channel. Amidst both praise and criticism, the BBC defend the scene by stating: "CBBC is proud to reflect all areas of children's lives, including age appropriate representation of same sex relationships". The moment generated over 100 complaints, to which the BBC defended it, saying: "We believe that the storyline, and the kiss, was handled with sensitivity and without sensationalism, following as it did the portrayal of Jude and Cleo's developing relationship and I am afraid we do not agree that it was inappropriate for the audience age".

On December 15, 2020, Petrana Radulovic of Polygon argued that 2020, when it came to all-ages animation, was a "glorious gay celebration that was unheard of just five years ago," including the love confession of Adora and Catra in the last episode of She-Ra and the Princesses of Power, Amity's romantic crush on Luz in The Owl House, the ending of Steven Universe, and the gay love story between Troy and Benson in Kipo and the Age of Wonderbeasts, and the development of Marceline and Bubblegum's relationship in the "Obsidian" episode of Adventure Time: Distant Lands. She specifically said that Obsidian was a "perfect end to this big gay year in animation," while noting that there is still work to do going forward. David Opie, Deputy TV Editor of Digital Spy said that he saw himself reflected in the final episode of She-Ra and the Princesses of Power, saying it was the first time he had "seen two lead characters enjoy queer domestic bliss so openly and without fear of reprisal," and said that he had long "settled for stories with ambiguous queer undertones" but this show went beyond that, part of an effort to create a better world.

In June 2021, Abbey White of Insider stated that more than 90% of LGBTQ characters in children's animation are in shows that "require either a cable, satellite, streaming, or internet subscription to view them on first airing," cutting off those without paid TV or internet from seeing "animated representation meant to represent them." David Levine, the head of Moonbug Entertainment, which owns Cocomelon, said that kids television on broadcast networks has disappeared, adding that "a crazy percentage of animation, of any kind, is behind a 'paywall'" in part because of the rise of cable television and end of syndicated cartoon blocks. White also said this happened due to the growing popularity of cable television, FCC regulations on children's programming, and companies seeing cable as a money-making venture. They noted that advertisers played a role, indirectly, in "curbing LGBTQ animated kids' content on free stations," with shows disappearing if the content of a program is "deemed controversial by an advertiser," with the showrunner of The Hollow saying that networks take fewer chances and try to be safer due to their advertisers. Levine also noted that this differs from streaming services, where a person can "always vote" with their dollar, meaning that subscriptions can be ended if a user doesn't like the content. White further said that while many have pointed to YouTube as an "answer to the dearth of inclusive and free kids programming," it isn't free to access because content on the platform is often "age-inappropriate" and locked behind a paywall of its own. They also said that while, with streaming shows, physical releases are declining, apps connected to them, which allow users to "download and save episodes to watch later without the internet" is a solution for some people. Other creators were even noted as cheering quietly for the "pirating of their content" or share curated clips from their respective shows.

Social acceptance
As stated by Jason Jacobs, queer people are demanding for culture to be more accepting of the community. In an attempt, shows such as Glee, are created where most of the characters have an identity that marginalizes them in some way. Some of the characters are gay, lesbian, disabled, and or belong to some other minority group. However, within these characters, there are homonormative aspects. The goal is for the disabled and minority characters to feel empowered about their differences and strive to be "normal". This normative behavior is exhibited through stereotypical perceptions of LGBT people, such as when gay men shop and spend uncontrollably when they are down.

Additionally, there is increasing focus on queer baiting within mainstream television, where shows court the LGBT "pink money" with heavy use of subtext to imply a queer pairing, but never following through with the subtext and risking alienating their more conservative-minded audiences.

The act of 'coming out' or publicly making everyone aware of your sexual orientation can be complicated for some people. The struggles that some LGBT people must face while coming out is different from person to person. It is imperative to attempt to relate to these individual's backgrounds while trying to understand them. "Race, Ethnicity, Gender, and Generational Factors Associated with the Coming-out Process Among Gay, Lesbian, and Bisexual Individuals" clearly identifies the processes some people go through.

São Paulo speaks about a cities effort to decrease the discrimination against gay pride by planning to create new laws protecting people from the negativity of it all. It is said that they also plan to create a gay museum dedicated to all of those who have put in efforts for equal rights for the LGBT community. This new law is said to be taking place in Brazil, with the hopes that many will follow in their lead. Paulo says, "The activists and parade organizers said a law that would ban discrimination against lesbian, gay, bisexual and transgender people is overdue in Brazil".

Media portrayal and social change
Although there are many negative consequences that arise from LGBT portrayal in media, there are some positive consequences as well. Seeing LGBT people in the media can bring about more acceptance of these people. This is because before LGBT people appeared in media, many people had no idea what they may be like. Because many LGBT people chose not to openly talk about themselves, their peers and families may either have no idea or a negative perception about what it is like to be an LGBT person. Thus, LGBT people may be misrepresented in the media.

Media portrayal of LGBT people has also been important in furthering activist movements for LGBT populations, especially where American history is concerned. LGBT people have recently gained more visibility for their positive contributions to movements for social change. For example, in the documentary United in Anger: A History of ACT UP, LGBT people of diverse backgrounds are recognized for their integral role in securing greater access to healthcare for those living with AIDS as well as national attention for a population largely ignored by the government and other important institutions.

The change in the portrayal of LGBT over time is positive. In the 1990s on ABC, a show called Roseanne featured an episode in which a woman briefly kissed another woman and this was preceded by a viewer discretion warning. However, ABC aired an episode of Grey's Anatomy in 2011 ("White Wedding" - 7.20) showing a lesbian wedding between the characters Callie and Arizona. This was before same-sex marriage was state-wide legalized as this happened in 2015.

The change in representation of racial diversity in the LGBT community is advancing towards a more equal standpoint. In the early stages of television, there was hardly any media representation of people of color at all, let alone LGBT people of color. However, as media and its audience are evolving the willingness to show more racial diversity on a global scale. This attempt at equality is to make people of all gender, race, class, ethnicity and sexual orientation feel as though they are represented fairly and evenly. Specific steps taken towards this goal are the use of different diverse characters on television. As well as the diverse characters, GLAAD is also making it a point that LGBT people of different races can have professions like doctors, teachers, etc. This takes away the single focus on their sexual preference or race etc., and displays the complexity of these characters as they would with any straight or white or middle class person.

LGBT media advocacy organizations
Many LGBT organizations exist to represent and defend the gay community. For example, the GLAAD in the United States and Stonewall in the UK work with the media to help portray fair and accurate images of the gay community. There are many other LGBT advocacy organizations in the United States that are all working for the same cause, equality.

See also
 Media portrayal of bisexuality
 List of media portrayals of bisexuality
 Media portrayal of lesbianism
 Media portrayals of transgender people
 List of transgender characters in film and television
 Queer coding
 Queerbaiting
 Sissy villain

References